Sulanga (The Wind) is a 2005 Sri Lankan Sinhala drama film directed and produced by Bennett Rathnayake. It stars Sanath Gunathilake and Dilhani Ekanayake in lead roles along with Chandani Seneviratne and Palitha Silva. Music composed by Rohana Weerasinghe. The film also staged debut acting of Rathnayake's children Sathya Erandathi Rathnayake and Udara Rathnayake. It is the 1165th Sri Lankan film in the Sinhala cinema.

The film has received mostly positive reviews from critics. The film won six awards at the Calcutta International Film festival, Montreal IFF and Rio International Film Festival in Brazil. In 2006, the film won the Silver Remi Award at the Houston International Film Festival. The film was selected to be screened in the competitive section of Pyongyang International Film Festival in September 2006.

The film was released in DVD and VCD by Torana Home Video with English subtitles is distributed by Torana Music Box in December 2006.

Plot

Cast
 Sanath Gunathilake as Senarathne
 Dilhani Ekanayake as Crisanthi
 Chandani Seneviratne as Margaret
 Erandathi Rathnayake as Kumari
 Sriyani Amarasena as Judge
 Palitha Silva as Siripala
 Daya Alwis as Salesman
 Namel Weeramuni 
 Udara Rathnayake as Kumari's love interest
 Rangana Premaratne 
 Roger Seneviratne as Donald
 Seetha Kumari
 Bandula Vithanage as Senarathne's father
 Jagath Chamila as Threewheel driver
 Sanoja Bibile
 Semini Iddamalgoda

References

2005 films
2000s Sinhala-language films
Films set in Sri Lanka (1948–present)